Rajuri is a village in Rahata taluka of Ahmednagar district in the Indian state of Maharashtra.

Population
Population of village is 4,298 as of 2011 census, Out of total, 2,215 are males and 2,083 are females.

Economy
Primary occupation of village is agriculture and allied work.

Transport

Road
Village is located near Nagar - Manmad and Shrirampur - Sangamner highways.

Rail
Shrirampur railway station is the nearest railway station to a village.

Air
Shirdi Airport is the nearest airport to a village.

See also
List of villages in Rahata taluka

References 

Villages in Ahmednagar district